Telecommunications in Eritrea are under the authority of the Government of Eritrea.

Infrastructure
The Eritrea Telecommunication Services Corporation, more commonly known as EriTel, is the sole operator of both landline and mobile telephone communication infrastructure in Eritrea. However, it is one of several internet service providers in the country.

The domestic telecommunications infrastructure is very inadequate. Most fixed line telephones are located in Asmara, the capital and largest city. Cell phones are in increasing use throughout the country. The government is seeking international tenders to improve the system.

On 13 April 2006, Eritrea received a soft loan from the government of China to upgrade their communication infrastructure. The total sum loaned to EriTel was $23 million. All major cities are connected to the mobile telephone system in Eritrea except for Asseb, as of 2023.

Telephone
 Fixed phones in use: 58,500 lines, 159th in the world (2011).
 Mobile cellular phones in use: 241,900 lines, 175th in the world (2011).
 Combined fixed-line and mobile-cellular subscribership is less than 5 per 100 persons (2011).
 International country code: 291.

Radio and television
 The government controls all broadcast media with private ownership prohibited. Purchases of satellite dishes and subscriptions to international broadcast media are permitted.
 Radio networks: 2 state-owned (2007).
 TV stations: 1 state-owned (2007).

Internet
 Internet users: 48,692 users, 180th in the world; 0.8% of the population, 211th in the world (2012).
 Fixed broadband: 122 subscriptions, 192nd (last) in the world; 0.0% of the population, 192nd (last) in the world (2012).
 Mobile broadband: unknown.
 Internet hosts: 701 hosts, 177th in the world (2012).
 Internet service providers (ISPs): 4 (2005) - EriTel, CTS, TFanus, Ewan.
 Country code: ER
 Top level domain: .er

Internet censorship and surveillance
 Listed as Under Surveillance by Reporters Without Borders (RWB) in 2008, 2009, not in 2010, and again from 2011 to the present.

Eritrea has not set up a widespread automatic Internet filtering system, but it does not hesitate to order blocking of several diaspora websites critical of the regime. Access to these sites is blocked by two of the Internet service providers, Erson and Ewan, as are pornographic websitesand YouTube. Self-censorship is said to be widespread.

See also

 Media of Eritrea
 Freedom of press in Eritrea

References

External links
 GSM World page on Eritrea